The Tramway at Bourron (French Réseau des Sablières de Bourron au Canal du Loing) was a  long  gauge railway that ran from the sand pits at Bourron-Marlotte via the Bourron-Marlotte – Grez railway station to the Canal du Loing opposite to Montcourt-Fromonville in France.

History 
The Société des Sandlières de Bourron was founded in 1911 to exploit the Bourron sand pits, located in the Forest of Fontainebleau, west of the village of Bourron-Marlotte and north of the Bourron-Marlotte – Grez railway station. Very high quality quartz glass can be produced from the dazzling white sand mined in the Arrondissement of Fontainebleau. It is mainly used for the production of crystal glass and optical glass, e.g. for the optical instruments of NASA. 

Shortly after the company was founded, the narrow-gauge line was built from the sand pit with a bridge over the  railway tracks of the PLM to its station. The line was extended in 1913 over an iron truss bridge to the Canal du Loing near Montcourt-Fromonville, where bulk goods could be transported more cheaply than by rail.

Philippe Lévêque and Daniel Tallet described the light railway line in the following words:

Commercial goods transport on the narrow-gauge railway was discontinued in 1969. These days, the sand pits are operated by Sibelco with the help of lorries. Part of the line is used as a museum railway under the name Tacot des Lacs.

Locomotives 

Up to twelve 0-4-0 Henschel steam locomotives were used on the line from 1920 to 1959. One of them is preserved at the Chambon de Nemours company and one, No. 15311, at the Pithiviers Transport Museum. At the end of the commercial railway operation, six T75 Billard diesel locomotives were used instead. Two of them are preserved, one on the P'tit Train de Saint-Trojan-les-Bains in Saint-Trojan-les-Bains and one on the Froissy Dompierre Light Railway.

Footnotes

References 

Tram transport in France
Railway lines opened in 1911
Railway lines closed in 1969
600 mm gauge railways